The 2017 TCR Scandinavia Touring Car Championship was the seventh Scandinavian Touring Car Championship season. This season will see the introduction of the TCR regulations. The season started at Ring Knutstorp on 7 May and ended at Mantorp Park on 17 September, after eight rounds.

Teams and drivers

Team and driver changes 
With the introduction of the new technical regulations many of the teams competing in the previous season did not return. Polestar Cyan Racing left the STCC for the support Swedish GT series. Flash Engineering also left the championship.

Calendar
On 18 October 2016, a preliminary calendar was announced, with one round still to be announced. The championship will host six rounds in Sweden and one round in Finland.

Race calendar and results

Championship standings

Drivers' Championship

Teams' Championship

References

External links
 

Scandinavia Touring Car Championship
TCR